Foreskin's Lament is a landmark play in the history of New Zealand theatre. It was the breakthrough play for its writer, Greg McGee, and was initially workshopped at the New Zealand Playwrights' Conference in Wellington in 1980, and has since become a staple of New Zealand theatre. Being produced as it was immediately before and during the social unrest of the 1981 Springbok Tour of New Zealand, it hit a nerve with the public and was named Best New Zealand Play of 1981.

The play is a drama set in a rugby union changing room after a practice, and at an after-match party. The captain is kicked in the head off-stage at the beginning of the first act, and again during the game between acts, by his own teammate and the play's antagonist, Clean. He dies in hospital during the second act. The theme is the conflict between fair play and winning at all costs, and the non-conformist lead character Foreskin's struggle to reconcile his university liberal values with those of his rugby-playing conservative mates. The play ends with Foreskin directly addressing the audience in a monologue - or rather interrogation - filled with rugby allusions, questioning their own values, ending with the repeated question, "Whaddarya?" (usually used in New Zealand to question someone's masculinity). Early performances left audiences in stunned silence. In some productions Foreskin undresses during the lament and finishes nude.

A significant production of the play was put on by the Downstage Theatre Company of Wellington in 1991. Their 1985 season had also included a memorable production of Foreskin's Lament, with some of the original cast reprising their roles in 1995.

In New Zealand a rugby union player is an everyman, and the game and play present a model of society.  Set in 1976, it looks forward to the 1981 Springbok Tour. Some have suggested that the ironically named character "Clean" is based on the New Zealand Prime Minister, Rob Muldoon. The script was updated after the 1981 tour and was later heavily revised by the author for filming as Skin and Bones.

References

External links
New Zealand On Air
Greg McGee
Review of 1999 production

1981 plays
New Zealand plays
Rugby union in New Zealand
Rugby union and apartheid
Rugby union controversies
Plays about sport